Filza Garifovich Khamidullin (3 January 1936 – 5 January 2022) was a Russian economist and politician.

Biography
He represented Tatarstan in the Federation Council from 2003 to 2005. He died on 5 January 2022, at the age of 86.

References

1936 births
2022 deaths
20th-century Russian politicians
21st-century Russian politicians
Politicians from Kazan
Members of the Federation Council of Russia (after 2000)
Recipients of the Order of the Red Banner of Labour
Russian economists